Jacinto Argaya Goicoechea (November 28, 1903 in Vera de Bidasoa, Navarra – March 12, 1993 in Valencia) was a Spanish-Basque prelate of the Catholic Church.

Goicoechea was born in a very traditionalist and conservative family. During the Spanish Civil War, he was a stalwart against Communism. He was consecrated Auxiliary Bishop of Valencia on August 15, 1952. From 1952 he held the position of Titular Bishop of Geras. He was appointed Bishop of Mondoñedo-Ferrol on October 27, 1957, where he represented his Diocese at the Second Vatican Council. Due to the doctrines expressed at the Council he began to adopt very progressive ideals. He took part in every meeting of every session of the Council.

He was appointed Bishop of San Sebastián on December 18, 1968. Here he was an outspoken critic against the summary Death Sentences condemning members of ETA in the Trial of Burgos. He resigned on February 17, 1979, and died in 1993 in Valencia

Sources
Catholic Hierarchy: Jacinto Argaya Goicoechea

1903 births
1993 deaths
People from Cinco Villas, Navarre
20th-century Roman Catholic bishops in Spain
Participants in the Second Vatican Council
Roman Catholic titular bishops of Geras